Daphne laureola, commonly called spurge-laurel, is a shrub in the flowering plant family Thymelaeaceae. Despite the name, this woodland plant is neither a spurge nor a laurel.  Its native range covers much of Europe and extends to Algeria, Morocco and the Azores.

Description
The habit of this shrub can be upright or decumbent (arched at the base then spreading upward). The bark is thin and yellow-grey when mature, while immature stems are green. The cambium is malodorous with a scent reminiscent of herb robert.

The alternate leaves usually form dense whorls at the shoot tips, but may clothe entire branches. The leaves are oblanceolate to obovate-oblanceolate, 2–13 cm long and 1–3 cm wide. They are glabrous (smooth), dark green and glossy on the upper surface and lighter in color beneath.

The inconspicuous yellow-green axial flowers, usually hidden among the leaf bases, may be strongly fragrant, or may exhibit no scent at all.

Distribution and habitat
With Daphne mezereum it is one of two species of Daphne native to Great Britain, both of which have a strong preference for alkaline soils and are most commonly found in limestone areas, although D. laureola is also found on clay. However, unlike D. mezereum, D. laureola is evergreen, with yellowish green flowers borne very early in the spring and black berries, which are poisonous to humans but not to birds, present from late summer. All parts of the plants are poisonous. The sap is known to cause skin rashes on contact.

As an invasive
Outside its native range, D. laureola can become a dangerous invasive weed. Growing in sun or shade, it is well-suited to the temperate forest understory and can rapidly colonize areas (both by seeding and by root suckering) to form monotypic stands and out-compete native vegetation. It is a Class B Noxious weed in Washington state. Already a weed under native forests in Tasmania, Australia, and New Zealand.

Mentioned on 5th Dec 1783, called dwarf laurels, by Gilbert White who “fetched them” from the high wood and hanger at Selborne and planted them in his garden.

Hand-pulling is effective against small infestations (gloves must be worn to protect against the caustic sap); shrubs too large or too small to pull must be dug out.

Etymology
Daphne is an ancient Greek name for laurel, and is also the name of the dryad Daphne, a figure in Greek mythology.

Laureola means 'laurel-like'. So, in summation, the binomial literally translates to 'laurel-like laurel'.

References

Daphne laureola info

External links

Spurge Laurel, Aliens Among Us.  Virtual Exhibit of the Virtual Museum of Canada.

laureola
Plants described in 1753
Taxa named by Carl Linnaeus